The Christine Rose is a self-propelled barge excavator dredge used to mine Bering Sea placer gold deposits in the region around Nome, Alaska, USA. It is owned by Pomrenke Mining and its registered home port is Nome, Alaska, USA. The Christine Rose is featured in the Discovery Channel USA mining reality TV show Bering Sea Gold.

Specifications

Vessel 175265
 Launch date: 1941
 Length:  
 Width: 
 Depth: 
 Net tonnage: 
 Gross tonnage:

References

External links
 Boat Database (boatdb.net) Nome, AK port boats

See also
 Myrtle Irene
 Tuvli 160
 AU Grabber
 Viking Dredge 1
 Viking Dredge 2
 Bima (dredge)

Bering Sea Gold
Ships of the United States
Dredgers